Liu Fuk Man (born 11 October 1952) is a Hong Kong table tennis player. He competed in the men's singles and the men's doubles events at the 1988 Summer Olympics.

References

External links
 

1952 births
Living people
Hong Kong male table tennis players
Olympic table tennis players of Hong Kong
Table tennis players at the 1988 Summer Olympics
Place of birth missing (living people)